July 4 is a 2007 Indian Malayalam-language film directed by Joshiy, starring Dileep, Siddique and Roma in the lead roles.

Plot
The story begins in a jail. Ramachandran, a very agile police officer, takes charge as the superintendent. He is given a brief about the jail and the prisoners by Narayanan Potti, who is the jailer.

One day Ramachandran comes face to face with Gokuldas, one of the prisoners who is to be released soon, on July 4. It is then revealed that the very reason Ramachandran had taken charge of the jail is to meet Gokuldas, with whom he has some old scores to settle. From here unfurls, in flashback sequences, the story of Gokuldas.

As a child, Gokuldas had no one but his mother to call his own; he lived in a street and worked in a cycle shop. When he is picked up by the police along with other boys from the street for a crime he has not committed, things go berserk in his life. His mother comes to get him released but is raped and killed by the police officer in charge of the station.

When Das comes out, he and friends takes revenge on the police officer, strangling him. Then they flee to Mumbai, where they become criminals, constantly clashing with the cops. Things get too hot for them when a daring police officer Mohammed Usman takes charge, and they break up, with Das taking refuge in a colony at the house of Gopalan, who is a kind-hearted taxi driver. He gets close with Gopalan and his family, but soon the cops reach there, too. In the tussle that follows, Gopalan is killed. Das, who escapes from the cops, is filled with remorse. Later, he takes Gopalan's family and leaves Mumbai, deciding to lead a good life. He works as a taxi driver at the Coimbatore airport. One day he meets a young girl, Sreepriya at the airport. She later travels in his car. When Sreepriya urges him to speed, offering him more money, he obliges, only to hit an auto rickshaw carrying school children. Sreepriya catches another taxi and continues on her way. Gokuldas later turns up at Sreepriya's house asking for compensation. Viswanathan, her father, offers him a job a driver, and things take a new turn.

After the engagement of Sreepriya with Suresh, the son of Ramachandran, Das takes Sreepriya for an examination in Coimbatore. But on the way back, they are chased by a gang of three toughies, who during the previous night, had tried to break into her bedroom. They hide in an old house in the forest. When Das meets the gang of three toughies, it is revealed in a flashback that they were his friends who helped him to kill the inspector. As they are forced to spend a few days together, they develop a liking for each other, and eventually in love. For saving her both from his friends, he jumps from the cliff holding her. They are saved by a Malayali named Shakthii in the forest. When both gain consciousness, Das reveals that he did all these things to fulfill a contract from Ramachandran as a retribution to him for a huge sum, which was borrowed for an operation of children of Gopalan as the auto-rickshaw hit by his car was carrying a group of school kids in which they were included. But it is unknown to him for what purpose Ramachandran gave him quotation to kill, which he was not expected.
It is later revealed that Viswanathan, is the stepfather of Priya as her mother married him, who is a widower and has a daughter from his first marriage, Shilpa.

Cast

Soundtrack

The movie features and acclaimed soundtrack composed by maestro Ouseppachan, with lyrics penned by Shibu Chakravarthy.

Release date
Some films in which Dileep was cast in the lead role and released on 4 July were big successes. The list includes Ee Parakkum Thalika (2001), Meesha Madhavan (2002), C.I.D. Moosa (2003), Pandippada (2005), Chess (2006). This film too was planned to release on 4 July 2007 and had to change to 5 July 2007, due to a court order on a complaint that the story was copied without permissions from the author.

Box office
The film ended with getting negative reviews, and became a big disaster in box office.

References

External links
 
 OneIndia article
 Nowrunning article
 IndiaGlitz article
 Metromatinee article

2000s Malayalam-language films
Films scored by Ouseppachan
2007 action films
2007 films
Indian action films
Indian prison films
Fictional portrayals of the Kerala Police
Films shot in Mumbai
Films shot in Coimbatore
Films directed by Joshiy